Goat Island, also known as Mokuauia, is a flat islet consisting of lithified dunes in Laie Bay on the northeast shore of Oahu, Hawaii. The islet is separated from Malaekahana State Recreation Area by a  channel of limestone reef shelf  underwater.

The islet is a Hawaii State Seabird Sanctuary.

Wildlife and conservation efforts

Goat Island is home to 16 native plant species, including the federally endangered Sesbania tomentosa. It is a breeding ground for thousands of wedge-tailed shearwaters.

The islet contains invasive species, including black rats, fire ants, and big headed ants. Black rats were first documented on the islet in 1967 with multiple eradication attempts in the 1990s and 2000s. The elimination of the rats resulted in increased wedge-tailed shearwater reproduction.

The dunes of the islet are a designated State Seabird Sanctuary, but its three beaches remain accessible to the public and attract many people annually.

References

Islands of Hawaii
Geography of Honolulu County, Hawaii